The St. Andrews Creek Bridge was built in 1930-31 as part of the West Side Road in Mount Rainier National Park. The West Side Road was planned to link the Nisqually and Carbon River entrances to the park, but only  were completed in six years.

The bridge was placed on the National Register of Historic Places on March 13, 1991. It is part of the Mount Rainier National Historic Landmark District, which encompasses the entire park, and which recognizes the park's inventory of Park Service-designed rustic architecture.

See also
List of bridges documented by the Historic American Engineering Record in Washington (state)

References

External link

Road bridges on the National Register of Historic Places in Washington (state)
Bridges completed in 1931
Arch bridges in the United States
Historic American Engineering Record in Washington (state)
National Park Service rustic in Washington (state)
Buildings and structures in Mount Rainier National Park
Bridges in Pierce County, Washington
National Register of Historic Places in Mount Rainier National Park
Concrete bridges in the United States
1931 establishments in Washington (state)